Ghulam Abbas (born 1 January 1955 ) is a Pakistani radio, television, and film singer. He is known for his ghazals, geets, and playback singing for Urdu and Punjabi movies. Besides winning 4 Nigar Awards as a playback singer, he was also honored with the Tamgha-i-Imtiaz (Medal of Excellence) in 2011 and the Pride of Performance Award in 2020 by the President of Pakistan.

Early life and education
Ghulam Abbas was born on January 1, 1955, in Jhang, Punjab, Pakistan. He got his school education in Multan. His higher education includes master's degrees in Philosophy and Urdu literature.

Singing career
Playback singer Mehdi Hassan noticed this young boy and introduced him to his mentor Ismail Khan. Abbas got an advanced classical training in singing from him.

Ghulam Abbas started his playback singing career with a Punjabi film "Aashiq Loag Soudai" in 1975. 
His first breakthrough was a song in the film "Ajnabi" (1975), under the musical direction of Nisar Bazmi. The song was "Wo aa to jaye magar intezar hi kam hai" and its popularity established him as a playback singer. Then musician Robin Ghosh gave him a career-boosting song, "Aise wo sharmaye jaise megha chaye" for movie "Do Saathi" (1975). From there on, Abbas gave voice to 129 songs in 120 films.

Apart from playback singing for movies, Abbas also sang many ghazals, semi-classical songs, and national songs for Radio Pakistan and Pakistan Television. His ghazal "Main ne roka bhi nahin aur wo thehra bhi nahin" won the award of having most broadcasts on Radio Pakistan.

Film songs
Some hit songs of Ghulam Abbas are:
 1975 (Film: Ajnabi): Woh Aa To Jaye Magar, Mera Intezar Hi Kam Hay, Music: Nisar Bazmi
 1975 (Film: Do Sathi): Aisay Woh Sharmaye, Jaisay Megha Chhaye, Music: Robin Ghosh
 1976 (Film: Deevar): Deewana Kahin Tum Ko Na, Deevana Bana Day, Music: M. Ashraf
 1977 (Film: Aashi): Jan-e-Tamanna, Kab Tak Tum Na, Pyar Mera Pehchano Gay, Music: Nazir Ali
 1978 (Film: Mehman): Dekh Kar Tujh Ko، Main Gham Dil Kay Bhula Deta Hun, Music: M. Ashraf
 1978 (Film: Mazi, Haal, Mustaqbil): Zindagi Tu Nay Har Qadm Peh Mujhay, Ek Sapna Neya Dikhaya Hay, Music: A. Hameed
 1978 (Film: Awaaz): Hari Bhari Abadian, Geet Gati Wadian, Music: A. Hameed
 1978 (Film: Intekhab): Ham Na Tarsen Kabhi Phir Khushi Kay Liye, Music: Nisar Bazmi
 1979 (Film: Pakeeza): Mil Jata Hay Yaar Magar Pyar Nahin Milta, Music: M. Ashraf
 1984 (Film: Bobby): Ik Bar Milo Ham Say To So Bar Milayn Gay, Music: Amjad Bobby
 2003 (Film: Shararat): Tu Hay Chand Raat, Music: Wajahat Attre

Classical songs / Ghazals
 Main ne roka bhi nahin aur wo thhehra bhi nahin, Poet: Aslam Ansari
 Khudi Ka Sir'r-e-Nehan La Ilaha Illallah, Poet: Allama Muhammad Iqbal
 Aye Pak watan Aye Pak Zameen, Poet: ?
 Mil ke bichar gaya, Poet: Adeen Taji

Awards and recognition

References

1955 births
Living people
Nigar Award winners
Pakistani ghazal singers
Pakistani playback singers
Punjabi people
Recipients of Tamgha-e-Imtiaz
20th-century Pakistani male singers
21st-century Pakistani male singers
Recipients of the Pride of Performance